Albert Barnes may refer to:

Albert Barnes (boxer) (1913–1990), Welsh Olympic boxer
Albert Barnes (theologian) (1798–1870), American theologian
Albert C. Barnes (1872–1951), American chemist and art collector
Albert Barnes & Co, locomotive manufacturers of Rhyl, Wales
A. R. Barnes (1867–1944), Attorney General of Utah

See also
Bert Barnes (disambiguation)